Admir Hasančić (born 29 November 1970) is a retired Bosnian-Herzegovinian football striker who spent his career playing for Čelik Zenica and FK Sarajevo in Bosnia, NK Rijeka and NK Zagreb in Croatian First League and Hapoel Petah Tikva in Israel.

International career
Hasančić made his debut for Bosnia and Herzegovina in a June 1998 friendly match away against Macedonia and has earned a total of 2 caps, scoring no goals. His other international was a January 1999 friendly match against Malta.

Honours

NK Čelik Zenica
Yugoslav Third League: 1
1990-91

NK Zagreb
Croatian First League: 1
2001-02

FK Sarajevo
Bosnian-Herzegovinian Premier League: 1
2006-2007

Achievements

With 46 league goals to his account in 147 appearances, Hasančić is HNK Rijeka's second top scoring and most capped foreign player. He is also the club's second top goalscorer in the Croatian First Football League since 1992.

Career statistics

References

External links

1970 births
Living people
People from Maglaj
Association football forwards
Yugoslav footballers
Bosnia and Herzegovina footballers
Bosnia and Herzegovina international footballers
NK Čelik Zenica players
HNK Rijeka players
NK Zagreb players
Hapoel Petah Tikva F.C. players
FK Sarajevo players
Yugoslav Second League players
Croatian Football League players
Premier League of Bosnia and Herzegovina players
Israeli Premier League players
Bosnia and Herzegovina expatriate footballers
Expatriate footballers in Croatia
Bosnia and Herzegovina expatriate sportspeople in Croatia
Expatriate footballers in Israel
Bosnia and Herzegovina expatriate sportspeople in Israel